The American Football Conference – Western Division or AFC West  is one of the four divisions of the American Football Conference (AFC) in the National Football League (NFL). The division comprises the Denver Broncos, Kansas City Chiefs, Las Vegas Raiders, and Los Angeles Chargers.

The division has sent teams to the Super Bowl eighteen times beginning with Super Bowl I when the Chiefs played the Green Bay Packers.  As of the 2022 season, the Broncos, Raiders and Chiefs were tied with the most Super Bowl wins within the division with 3 each; The Broncos have appeared in the most Super Bowls in the division with 8 and the Raiders and Chiefs have appeared in 5. The Chargers lost their lone Super Bowl appearance in Super Bowl XXIX.

The Chiefs won the most recent AFC West title in 2022. It was their  seventh consecutive AFC West title, moving them into a four-way tie with the Broncos, Raiders and Chargers for the most AFC West titles.

History
The division was formed in 1960 as the American Football League's Western Division. In 1970, as part of the new NFL's two-conference, six-division alignment, the AFL West entered the merged league more or less intact as the AFC West.

The original AFL West had four members – the Dallas Texans (who moved to Kansas City in 1963 as the Chiefs), Denver Broncos, Los Angeles Chargers (who moved to San Diego in 1961, then back to Los Angeles in 2017) and Oakland Raiders (who moved to Los Angeles in 1982, back to Oakland in 1995, and Las Vegas in 2020). These four teams have remained in the AFL/AFC West since its inception, and are currently the only teams in the division. Largely because of this, and the fact they have played each other twice a year for over 60 years, the entire division is considered one very large and very heated rivalry.

The Cincinnati Bengals played the last two AFL seasons in the AFL West despite being further east than Houston, where the Houston Oilers played at the time and were members of the AFL Eastern Division. The Bengals (along with the Oilers) moved to the AFC Central (now the AFC North) in 1970, forming rivalries with the Cleveland Browns and the Pittsburgh Steelers.

In 1977, the Seattle Seahawks were added to the AFC West after spending their expansion season in the NFC West; they would move back to the NFC West in 2002.  The first-year Tampa Bay Buccaneers in 1976 played as a member of the AFC West  before being aligned into the NFC Central in 1977.

Each of the four AFC West teams won a division title in the first four years of the realignment – Oakland in 2002, Kansas City in 2003, San Diego in 2004 and Denver in 2005. It is the only one of the eight NFL divisions to have all of its teams win titles in the first four seasons of the North-East-West-South format.

In the early and mid-2000s, the division was often cited as one of the NFL's "Toughest Divisions" due partially to the home-field advantages of Empower Field at Mile High, Arrowhead Stadium, Qualcomm Stadium and the Oakland Coliseum, although in 2008 the division was the NFL's weakest since the AFC Central in 1985 by sending the San Diego Chargers to the playoffs as division winners with an 8–8 record while the New England Patriots missed out at 11–5 after losing out on tiebreakers for both the AFC East and the wild-card. In 2010, the Raiders swept the entire division, going 6–0, but failed to qualify for the playoffs as they only won two non-divisional games.

The division was very weak in 2011 as well, when a loss by the Raiders in the last game of the season gave the Broncos the division title with only an 8–8 record. Only the NFC West in 2010, the NFC South in 2014 and 2022, and the NFC East in 2020 have historically sent a worse division winner to the playoffs, when the Seahawks (themselves a former AFC West member) won that division with a 7–9 record, the Panthers won the NFC South division with a 7–8–1 record, the Washington Football Team won the NFC East division with a 7–9 record, and the Buccaneers won the NFC South with an 8–9 record. Along with the AFC (formerly AFL) East, the AFC West is the oldest NFL division in terms of creation date (1960).

Division lineups
Place cursor over year for division champ or Super Bowl team.
 

 

 

Dallas Texans moved to Kansas City, Missouri and were subsequently renamed the Kansas City Chiefs (1963 season)
Los Angeles Chargers moved to San Diego (1961 season) but moved back in 2017.
Oakland Raiders moved to Los Angeles (1982 season). The team returned to Oakland for the 1995 season.
Cincinnati Bengals enfranchised (1968 season). After 1970 merger with NFL, the team moved to the AFC Central.
Tampa Bay was enfranchised in 1976. The Buccaneers moved to the NFC Central after their inaugural season, and departed for the newly formed NFC South after the 2001 season.
Seattle Seahawks moved from the NFC West division (1977 Season). In 2002 they moved back to the NFC West.
Oakland Raiders moved to the Las Vegas area (2020 season).

Division champions

 !The Oakland Raiders and Kansas City Chiefs tied for the regular season division title at 12–2. The Raiders won the ensuing playoff game to represent the West in the AFL Championship Game.
 #A players' strike in 1982 reduced the regular season to nine games. Thus, the league used a special 16-team playoff tournament just for this year. Division standings were ignored, the Los Angeles Raiders had the best record of the division teams.

Wild Card qualifiers

# In 1969, The Western Division 2nd place team played the Eastern Division 1st place team in an Interdivisional game.
 A players' strike in 1982 reduced the regular season to nine games. Thus, the league used a special 16-team playoff tournament just for this year. Division standings were ignored, the Los Angeles Raiders had the best record of the division teams.

Total playoff berths
Updated through the 2020–21 NFL playoffs

Former division members
The table below reflects division titles and playoff appearances from former members of the AFL/AFC West while still in the division.

Season results

See also
 Broncos–Chargers rivalry
 Broncos–Chiefs rivalry
 Broncos–Raiders rivalry
 Chargers–Chiefs rivalry
 Chargers–Raiders rivalry
 Chiefs–Raiders rivalry

References

National Football League divisions
Cincinnati Bengals
Denver Broncos
Kansas City Chiefs
Las Vegas Raiders
Los Angeles Chargers
Seattle Seahawks
Tampa Bay Buccaneers
Sports in the Western United States
1960 establishments in the United States